The Charleston Pirates were a minor league baseball club based in Charleston, South Carolina. The played at College Park as an affiliate of the Pittsburgh Pirates, in the class-A Western Carolinas League. In 1976 and 1977, the team played under the name, the Charleston Patriots.

Season results

Baseball teams established in 1973
Sports clubs disestablished in 1978
Defunct minor league baseball teams
Professional baseball teams in South Carolina
Pittsburgh Pirates minor league affiliates
Defunct baseball teams in South Carolina
1973 establishments in South Carolina
1970s disestablishments in South Carolina
Sports in Charleston, South Carolina
Baseball teams disestablished in 1978
Defunct Western Carolinas League teams